Momentus Inc, sometimes styled Momentus space, is an American spaceflight company founded by Mikhail Kokorich which plans to offer space infrastructure services in the form of on-orbit services. The company advertises three orbital tug services which are based around spacecraft electric propulsion and vary in payload mass and Delta-v. As of late 2022 the company has launched one demonstration mission, which produced mixed results.

History 

Momentus space was a 2018 graduate of the Y Combinator program.

Momentus space received 8.3 million US dollars of seed funding in November 2018. The investors were Prime Movers Lab, Liquid 2 Ventures, One Way Ventures, Mountain Nazca, Y Combinator, and others.

In 2019, Momentus claimed that its Microwave Electrothermal Thruster (MET) was successfully tested in space, though the U.S. Securities and Exchange Commission accused it of misleading investors via this claim.

In 2020, Momentus was merged with a SPAC which valued it at 1.2 Billion US dollars though its valuation quickly dropped to half of this value when it began public trading.

Momentus space had its first demonstration launch of a vehicle in 2022, which achieved mixed results.

Services 

Momentus space lists plans to offer "space infrastructure" services, including space transportation, on-orbit refueling, and on-orbit services of satellites. Space transportation in the form of space tugs is particularly emphasized. The website lists three models of tug with successively larger payload masses and Delta-v capabilities, in ascending order, name Vigoride, Ardoride, and Fervoride. A still larger tug, called Valoride, has since been removed from their website. These tugs are propelled by the company's Microwave Electrothermal Thruster (MET), a form of spacecraft electric propulsion in which water is ionized by microwaves and accelerated out of the spacecraft. The specific impulse of these propulsion systems is targeted to be "two or three times" that of chemical propulsion systems, putting them at the low end of existing electric propulsion systems (this conversely puts them at the  end of the specific thrust, or thrust per unit input power).

First demonstration flight 

On May 26, 2022, Momentus space launched its first demonstration mission on a SpaceX Falcon 9 launch vehicle as part of the Transporter-5 multi-payload ride-share launch. The Momentus Vigoride-3 space tug was one of several private space tugs launched by that mission. The Vigoride tug carried several payloads for two customers, FOSSA Systems and Orbit NTNU. The Vigoride spacecraft experienced multiple anomalies: at least one due to folding solar panels not deploying, and at least one which caused an off-nominal communication mode. The spacecraft deployed two FOSSA satellites on May 28, 3 days after its launch, and four more between June and August inclusive. Between August and September inclusive, the spacecraft deployed its Orbit NTNU payload, called SelfieSat. As of September 2022, two remaining FOSSA payloads remained un-deployed on the Vigoride spacecraft.

Another Vigoride demonstration mission, using the Vigoride-5 spacecraft, launched on the SpaceX Transporter-6 launch on 3 January 2023.

References 

Private spaceflight companies
Space technology
Space tugs
Space
Space-based economy
Space access
Space applications
Space industry
Space industry companies